Arf-GAP domain and FG repeat-containing protein 1 is a protein that in humans is encoded by the AGFG1 gene.

Function 

The protein encoded by this gene is related to nucleoporins, a class of proteins that mediate nucleocytoplasmic transport. This encoded protein binds the Rev activation domain when Rev is assembled onto its RNA target and can significantly enhance Rev activity when overexpressed. Several alternatively spliced transcript variants of this gene have been described, but the full-length nature of some of these variants has not been determined.

Interactions 

AGFG1 has been shown to interact with EPS15L1 and EPS15.

References

Further reading